Carnival Elation (formerly Elation) is a  operated by Carnival Cruise Line. Built by Kværner Masa-Yards at its Helsinki New Shipyard in Finland, she was floated out on January 4, 1998, and christened as Elation by Shari Arison Dorsman.  Her inaugural cruise began March 20, 1998. During 2007, in common with all of her Fantasy-class sisters, she had the prefix Carnival added to her name.

Layout
Carnival Elation is a 71,909-ton ship and is 855 feet long. She has a guest capacity of 2190 and a crew of 900.

History
Elation was the first cruise ship to be equipped with an Azipod propulsion system.  The pods give Elation better maneuverability compared with her sister ships that still used traditional shaft propellers.

On November 5, 2011 Carnival Elation was moved from Mobile, Alabama to New Orleans.

In October 2017, Carnival Elation completed a month long dry dock during which an extra deck was added and various modifications to her public facilities were made. The ship's next dry dock in March 2020 added additional features found on other Carnival ships. The ship also received an additional 30 cabins that replaced the aft lounge located on the promenade deck.

Current and former voyages
1998–2003: Cruises to Mexico from Los Angeles, California.

2003–2006: Cruises to the Western Caribbean from Galveston, TX.

2007–2010: Cruises to Mexico from San Diego CA.

2010–2011: Cruises from Mobile, Alabama to the Western Caribbean.

2011–2016: Cruises to the Western Caribbean from New Orleans, Louisiana.

2016–May 2019: Cruises to the Bahamas from Jacksonville, Florida.

May 2019-March 2020, October 2021-April 2022: Cruises to the Caribbean and Bahamas from Port Canaveral, Florida.

April 2022 and on: Cruises to the Bahamas from Jacksonville, Florida.

Accidents and incidents

 On September 10, 2017 the Carnival Elation responded to a distress call and rescued one person from the sea who had been forced to abandon a vessel during Hurricane Irma.
 On January 19, 2018, a Kansas man pleaded guilty after pushing his girlfriend Tamara Tucker off of the ship and pleaded guilty in a federal court in Kansas to second-degree murder.

References

Notes

Bibliography

External links
 
 Official website

1998 ships
Elation
Ships built in Helsinki
Elation